Aortic arch anomaly - peculiar facies - intellectual disability is a rare, genetic, congenital developmental anomaly which is characterized by heart abnormalities, cranio-facial dysmorphia, and intellectual disabilities. No new cases have been reported since 1968.

Signs and symptoms 

People with this disorder usually have the following symptoms:

Heart 
 Right-sided aortic arch

Craniofacial 
 Microcephaly
 Facial asymmetry
 Frontal bossing
 Hypertelorism
 Deviated nasal septum
 Rather large nasal cavity
 Prominent, rotated ears
 Microstomia

Intellect 
 Intellectual disabilities

Etiology 
This disorder was first discovered in 1968, when a mother and 3 of her children (4 cases) were described with the symptoms mentioned above. In this case, additional features were found in a majority of the patients; three of the patients had esophageal indentation and left ligamentum arteriosum, two of the patients, a still-born baby, had anencephaly. Another child died due to congenital heart disease. The child in question also had microcephaly. This disorder is suspected to be autosomal dominant.

References 

Rare genetic syndromes
Syndromes affecting the aorta
Syndromes with intellectual disability
Genetic anomalies